William Joel Masters (born March 15, 1944 in Grayson, Louisiana) is a former professional American football player. He played in the American Football League for the Buffalo Bills (1967–1969) and in the National Football League for the Denver Broncos (1970–1974) and the Kansas City Chiefs (1975–1976). Masters played college football at Louisiana State University in Baton Rouge, Louisiana.

References

External links
 NFL.com player page
 Billy Masters Football Database

1944 births
Living people
American football tight ends
LSU Tigers football players
Buffalo Bills players
Denver Broncos players
Kansas City Chiefs players
People from Caldwell Parish, Louisiana
Players of American football from Louisiana
American Football League players